Diego Núñez de Figueroa (Latin: Didacus Nunnez Figueira) was a Roman Catholic prelate who served as Bishop-Elect of Macau (1576–1578).

Biography
On 26 Jan 1576, Diego Núñez de Figueroa was appointed during the papacy of Pope Gregory XIII as Bishop of Macau.
He was not consecrated and resigned as Bishop-Elect of Macau in 1578. He never went to China.

References

External links
 
  

16th-century Roman Catholic bishops in Portuguese Macau
Bishops appointed by Pope Gregory XIII